Bend is a city in and the county seat of Deschutes County, Oregon, United States. It is the principal city of the Bend Metropolitan Statistical Area. Bend is Central Oregon's largest city, with a population of 99,178 at the time of the 2020 U.S. Census, up from 76,693 at the time of the 2010 U.S. Census, and 52,029 at the 2000 census. The Bend metro population was 198,253 as of the 2020 census. It is the fifth largest metropolitan area in Oregon.

Bend is located on the eastern edge of the Cascade Range along the Deschutes River. There the Ponderosa pine forest transitions into the high desert, characterized by arid land, junipers, sagebrush, and bitterbrush. Originally a crossing point on the river, settlement began in the early 1900s. Bend was incorporated as a city in 1905. Economically, it started as a logging town but is now identified as a gateway for many outdoor sports, including mountain biking, fishing, hiking, camping, rock climbing, white-water rafting, skiing, paragliding, and golf. As of 2023 the city is also the home of the last Blockbuster video rental store.

History

The name "Bend" was derived from "Farewell Bend", the designation used by early pioneers to refer to the location along the Deschutes River where the town was eventually platted, one of the few fordable points along the river.

Native Americans hunted and fished here. In the winter of 1824, members of a fur-trapping party led by Peter Skene Ogden visited the area. John C. Frémont, John Strong Newberry, and other Army survey parties came next. Then pioneers heading farther west passed through the area and forded the Deschutes River at Farewell Bend.

Constructed in May 1901, the Pilot Butte Development Company's little plant was the first commercial sawmill in Bend. The original location was at the rear of the Pilot Butte Inn of later years. Steidl and Reed also set up a small mill in Bend in 1903. This was on the Deschutes River just below the Pioneer Park area. The mill was operated by water power.

A small community developed around the area. In 1904, a city was incorporated by a general vote of the community's 300 residents. On January 4, 1905, the city held its first official meeting as an incorporated municipality, appointing A. H. Goodwillie as the first mayor. The settlement was originally called "Farewell Bend", which was later shortened to "Bend" by the United States Post Office Department.

In 1910, Mirror Pond was created by the construction of the Bend Water, Light & Power Company dam on the Deschutes River in Bend. The dam provided the city with its initial source of electricity. The dam has been owned by Pacific Power since 1926 and still produces electricity that supplies approximately 200 Bend households.  In 1916, Deschutes County was formed from the western half of Crook County and Bend was designated as the county seat. In 1929, Bend amended the charter and adopted the council–manager form of government.

On August 28, 2022, a mass shooting occurred at a Safeway grocery store in Bend. Two senior citizens, one of whom was an employee at the store, were killed, and two others were wounded before the gunman committed suicide.

Geography
Bend sits on the boundary of the Eastern Cascades Slopes and Foothills, a Level III ecoregion designated by the United States Environmental Protection Agency (EPA) in the U.S. states of Oregon, Washington, and California, and the Deschutes River Valley, a Level IV ecoregion within the Blue Mountains Level III ecoregion.

The Deschutes River runs through Bend, where it is dammed to form Mirror Pond.

Inside the city limits is Pilot Butte State Scenic Viewpoint, an old cinder cone. Bend is one of three cities in the continental U.S. (with Portland, Oregon, and Jackson, Mississippi) to have an extinct volcano within its city limits. It is reached by U.S. Route 20. A lesser known characteristic of Bend, the Horse Lava Tube System enters and borders the eastern edge of the city. Just south of Bend is Newberry National Volcanic Monument on U.S. Route 97.

Climate

Bend's climate is typical of the high desert with cool nights and sunny days, classified as semi-arid (Köppen climate classification BSk). Annual precipitation averages . Nighttime temperatures are not much lower than daytime highs during the winter.

Hard frosts are not unheard of during the summer months. Autumn usually brings warm, dry days and cooler nights. Bend is known for its annual Indian summer. 

Bend's growing season is short; according to the U.S. Department of Agriculture's National Resources Conservation Service, in half of the years between 1971 and 2000, the USDA weather station in Bend recorded the last below-freezing temperatures after July 3 and the first below-freezing temperatures before August 31. Based on 1981–2010 normals, the average window for freezing temperatures is September 13 through June 19.

Demographics

Bend is the larger principal city of the Bend-Prineville CSA, a Combined Statistical Area that includes the Bend metropolitan area (Deschutes County) and the Prineville micropolitan area (Crook County), which had a combined estimated population of 216,310 by the United States Census Bureau in 2008.

2010 census
As of the census of 2010, there were 76,639 people, 31,790 households, and 19,779 families residing in the city. The racial makeup of the city was 91.3% White, 0.5% African American, 0.8% Native American, 1.2% Asian, 0.1% Pacific Islander, 3.4% from other races, and 2.6% from two or more races. Hispanic or Latino of any race were 8.2% of the population.

There were 31,790 households, of which 31.7% had children under the age of 18 living with them, 47.9% were married couples living together, 9.9% had a female householder with no husband present, 4.4% had a male householder with no wife present, and 37.8% were non-families. 27.1% of all households were made up of individuals, and 9.1% had someone living alone who was 65 years of age or older. The average household size was 2.39 and the average family size was 2.91.

The median age in the city was 36.6 years. 23.7% of residents were under the age of 18; 8.7% were between the ages of 18 and 24; 30% were from 25 to 44; 25.1% were from 45 to 64; and 12.4% were 65 years of age or older. The gender makeup of the city was 49.0% male and 51.0% female.

2000 census
As of the census of 2000, there were 52,029 people, 21,062 households, and 13,395 families residing in the city. The population density was 1,624.8 people per sq mi (627.4/km). There were 22,507 housing units at an average density of 702.9 per sq mi (271.4/km). The racial makeup of the city was 93.98% White, 0.28% African American, 0.79% Native American, 1.00% Asian, 0.08% Pacific Islander, 1.75% from other races, and 2.12% from two or more races. Hispanics or Latinos of any race were 4.61% of the population.

There were 21,062 households, out of which 31.9% had children under the age of 18 living with them, 50.2% were married couples living together, 9.7% had a female householder with no husband present, and 36.4% were non-families. 26.1% of all households were made up of individuals, and 8.6% had someone living alone who was 65 years of age or older. The average household size was 2.42, and the average family size was 2.92.

The age distribution was 24.5% under the age of 18, 10.2% from 18 to 24, 31.1% from 25 to 44, 21.9% from 45 to 64, and 12.4% who were 65 years of age or older. The median age was 35 years. For every 100 females, there were 97.1 males. For every 100 females age 18 and over, there were 95.6 males.

The median income for a household in the city was $40,857, and in 2006 the median income for a family of four is $58,800. Males had a median income of $33,377 versus $25,094 for females. The per capita income for the city was $21,624. About 6.9% of families and 10.5% of the population were below the poverty line, including 13.8% of those under age 18 and 5.8% of those age 65 or over.

Economy

Tourism is one of Bend's largest sectors. The Mount Bachelor ski resort brings in tourists from all over Oregon, Washington, and California. The nearby Cascade Lakes are also a large draw for tourists. Recreational activities include downhill and cross country skiing, hiking, biking, rafting, golfing, camping, fishing, picnicking, rock climbing, and general sightseeing. Transient room tax revenues through the first quarter of fiscal year 2015 equaled $2,221,610.

The transient room tax is used in partnership with Visit Bend and the Bend Economic Development Advisory Board to convert visitors to Bend into residents and business owners. In 2011, Visit Bend reported that families are the largest demographic that visit Bend (35%), while couples with no children make up the second largest portion (24%) of visitors to the city. During the same year, tourism generated $570 million and employed 16% of the city's workforce. Brauns, L. (2021, November 21). According to a 2019 economic impact data from Travel Oregon, “the local tourism industry employs 10,000 people and brings in more than $1 billion into the regional economy” 

Room taxes attributed to tourism in Bend is divided up to be given back to the community. Bend, Oregon depends on $7 million in the room tax income that essentially funds services for Streets, Fire, and Police. $3 million are specifically contributed to Tourism Promotion. As of April 2021, the Bend City Council has agreed to spend an undisclosed portion of the $3 million to maintain some of the trails in the city.

Bend is home to the Deschutes Brewery, the eighth-largest craft brewery in the nation and the largest of over a dozen microbreweries in the city. Each year the city hosts many events celebrating its brewing culture, including the Bend Oktoberfest, the Little Woody Barrel Aged Brew and Whiskey Fest, Bend Brewfest, and Central Oregon Beer Week. Beer aficionados can also visit many of the breweries along the Bend Ale Trail. As of 2018, there were 23 breweries in Bend and 4 hard cider companies. Since 2017, Bend's Worthy Brewing has hosted an observatory with a 16-inch reflecting Ritchey–Chrétien telescope.

In 2005, Bend's economic profile comprised five industry categories: tourism (7,772 jobs); healthcare and social services (6,062 jobs); professional, scientific and technical services (1,893 jobs); wood products manufacturing (1,798 jobs); and recreation and transportation equipment (1,065 jobs).

In 2019, the officially licensed Blockbuster Video in the city became the last remaining one in the world.

Much of Bend's rapid growth in recent years is also due to its attraction as a retirement destination.  The rapid population growth has fostered organizations such as Central Oregon Landwatch and Oregon Solutions.

Bend has also become a commuter town for a number of tech workers in the San Francisco Bay Area and Seattle metropolitan area despite the extreme commute, due to its appeal to the outdoors as well as its relatively cheap cost of living compared to the skyrocketing rent and housing prices of the Bay Area and Seattle.

Construction and real estate
In 2005 construction and real estate accounted for 17.3 percent of all jobs in the Bend metropolitan statistical area (MSA), which constitutes all of Deschutes County.  This figure is about 70 percent more than the proportion of construction and real estate jobs in the Oregon and national economies.  Construction activity in Bend appears to be slowing. The number of building permit applications received by the Bend City Building Division fell from 826 in August 2006 to 533 in August 2007, a 35 percent decrease.

A large influx of new residents drawn by Bend's lifestyle amenities, along with the low interest rates and easy lending that fostered a national housing boom in 2001–05, resulted in increased activity in Bend's construction and real estate sectors and caused the rate of home price appreciation in Bend to grow substantially during that period. Median home prices in the Bend MSA increased by over 80% in the 2001–05 period.

In June 2006, Money magazine named the Bend MSA the fifth most overpriced real estate market in the United States.  By September 2006, the Bend metro area ranked second in the list of most overpriced housing markets, and in June 2007 it was named the most overpriced housing market in America.

The 2008−09 housing downturn had a strong effect on Bend's housing and economic situation.  According to the Seattle Times, single-family home prices dropped more than 40 percent from a peak of $396,000 in May 2007 to $221,000 in March 2009.  Additional signs of the housing downturn include an April 2009 Deschutes county unemployment rate of 12.6 percent and in a tri-county area of Deschutes, Crook and Jefferson counties a 66 percent rise in homelessness from 2006 to 2,237.

In May 2010, the Federal Housing and Finance Agency released a report in which Bend had the largest price drop in the country, 23 percent, from first quarter of 2009 to the first quarter of 2010.

Arts and culture

The city is becoming known for its burgeoning art scene, and is home to numerous visual and fine art galleries, as well as the independent BendFilm Festival, which launched in 2004.

There are numerous public art displays, including the Roundabout Art Route tour of outdoor sculptures throughout the city.

Museums
 Deschutes Historical Museum (located in the historic Reid School building)
 High Desert Museum

National Register of Historic Places
 Bend Amateur Athletic Club Gymnasium
 Charles Boyd Homestead Group
 Downing Building
 Drake Park Neighborhood Historic District
 George Palmer and Dorothy Binney Putnam House
 Goodwillie–Allen House
 N. P. Smith Pioneer Hardware Store
 O'Kane Building
 Thomas McCann House
 Trinity Episcopal Church

Venues, restaurants, and shopping
 Hayden Homes Amphitheater
 Old Mill District
 Pine Tavern
 Tower Theatre
 Old St. Francis School

Natural history
 Mirror Pond
 Pine Mountain Observatory

Sports
Bend is home to the Bend Elks of the West Coast Collegiate Baseball League. The Elks play at Vince Genna Stadium. Former minor league teams include the Bend Rockies, Bend Bucks, Bend Phillies, Bend Timber Hawks, and Bend Rainbows.

Bend is also the home of the Central Oregon Hotshots of the International Basketball League. The Central Oregon Steelheaders, continually one of the top teams in the NW conference of the Premier Arena Soccer League (PASL), play at the Central Oregon Indoor Sports Center in Bend.

Bend is the home of the professional cross-country skiing team XC Oregon, which competes in races locally, regionally, nationally and internationally.

Bend has had success in landing major sporting events such as the 2008 and 2009 USA Winter Triathlon National Championships, the 2008 and 2009 XTERRA Trail Running National Championships, the 2009 and 2010 United States National Cyclo-cross Championships, the 2009 and 2010 USA Cycling Elite Road National Championships and the 2013, 2015 and 2016 USA Cross Country Championships.

In 2019 and 2020, Bend hosted USA Climbing's pro and youth National Bouldering Championships.

Bend was recently named the top mountain bike city in Mountain Bike Action magazine.

Bend features the Bend Roughriders RFC, a men's division 3 Rugby Football Club.

Bend's Lava City Roller Dolls became a member of the Women's Flat Track Derby Association in April, 2009.

Bend's Pole Pedal Paddle is one of the Pacific Northwest's premier athletic events. It is a relay race held each spring with six legs that include alpine skiing/snowboarding, cross-country skiing, biking, running, canoeing/kayaking and sprinting. The event begins at Mount Bachelor and ends in the Old Mill District.

Bend is also home to the Deschutes County Rocks Boxing Team, a USA Boxing program ran by Level III USA Boxing coach Richard Miller, who is also the Golden Gloves & Silver Gloves President. February of each year Coach Miller hosts the Oregon State Golden Gloves Boxing Championship at Eagle Crest resort, a two-day event that highlights the best Olympic-bound boxers in the Northwest while bringing hundreds of boxing fans to the area. The program is non-profit and raises money for youth in the community.

Running is also a popular sport in Bend. The city is home to the Cascade Lakes Relay, Bend Beer Chase, Haulin' Aspen Trail Marathon, XTERRA Trail Running National Championships, and the Pilot Butte Challenge. The Cascade Lakes Relay is the largest sporting event in Central Oregon with over 3,000 participants each year. One of the largest running clubs in Bend is Central Oregon Running Klub (CORK). Runners also enjoy parks such as Shevlin, Tumalo Falls, and Deschutes River Trail.

With the opening of the Bend Pavilion ice rink in 2015, Bend established its first USA Hockey sanctioned amateur ice hockey program, the Bend Rapids. The Rapids field four different teams in the 10u, 12u, 14u and high school divisions. In January the pavilion hosts the Cascade Invitational Hockey tournament. The three-day tournament features amateur hockey teams from Washington and Oregon.

Parks and recreation

The Bend Park & Recreation District protects the parks, natural areas, recreational facilities, gardens, and trails of Bend.
 Cascade Lakes Scenic Byway
 Deschutes River
 Drake Park
 Pilot Butte State Park
 Shevlin Park
 McKay Park
 Farewell Bend Park
 Riverbend Park
 Ponderosa Skatepark

Education

Higher Education
Central Oregon Community College and the OSU-Cascades Campus of Oregon State University offer two- and four-year programs.

Public schools
The Bend area is served by Bend–La Pine School District. It contains five high schools (Bend, Marshall, Mountain View, La Pine, Caldera High School, and Summit). It also contains six middle schools (Cascade, High Desert, Pilot Butte, Pacific Crest, La Pine and Sky View), and 19 elementary schools which include three magnet schools.

Within Bend-LaPine, additional special schools include an environmentally focused middle school and high school called Realms. Charter schools include Desert Sky Montessori and the K-8 Bend International School.

Private schools
Private schools in the area include Cascades Academy of Central Oregon, Seven Peaks, Waldorf School of Bend, St. Francis of Assisi, Morning Star Christian, and Trinity Lutheran School.

Media
Newspapers
 Bend Bulletin
 The Source Weekly
 Cascade Business News

Television
 KOAB-TV 3 (PBS)
 KTVZ 21 (NBC) - The region's first broadcast TV station (launched in 1977).
 KFXO-CD 39 (FOX) - On April 17, 2006, the station launched a local news broadcast. The station later was purchased by KTVZ's parent firm, News-Press and Gazette Co.
 KOHD 51 (ABC) - Chambers Communications (Eugene, Oregon) recently purchased a broadcast license for the market and began its local newscasts in the fall of 2007.
 KBNZ-LD 7 (CBS) - TDS, parent company of Bend Broadband, has purchased KBNZ. KOIN-TV Portland's news is offered with no local cut-ins.
 NTVZ-CW (CW). KTVZ (DT2).  Broadcast by NPG of Oregon, The CW carries popular entertainment programming.  First local on-air broadcast was September 2006.
 KQRE-TM (Telemundo). Subchannel of KFXO-CD.  Spanish language television broadcast by NPG of Oregon since 2007.
 COTV 11 - Carries RSN (Resort Sports Network), local events (parades, city council meetings, candidate forums). In addition, COTV airs local sports, including the Central Oregon Hotshots, Bend Elks, and local high school teams.

Radio

AM
 KRCO 690 AM - Sports format
 KBND 1110 AM - News Talk Information format
 KRDM 1240 AM - Regional Mexican format
 KBNW 1340 AM - News Talk Information format

FM
 KLBR 88.1 FM - National Public Radio and locally produced radio shows from Lane Community College.  KLBR is a simulcast of KLCC (FM) in Eugene, Oregon.
 KWRX  98.9 FM - non-commercial classical music radio station broadcasting to the Bend, Oregon area.  KWRX is a simulcast of KWAX in Eugene, Oregon.
 KPOV-FM 88.9 FM - Low-power community radio station owned by the Women's Civic Improvement League.
 KVRA 89.3 FM - Contemporary Christian format. Air 1
 KVLB 90.5 FM - Contemporary Christian format K-LOVE.
 KOAB-FM 91.3 FM - Oregon Public Broadcasting
 KRCO-FM 95.7 FM - Classic country format. 
 KNLR 97.5 FM - Contemporary Christian format. 
 KTWS 98.3 FM - Classic rock format. 
 KMTK 99.7 FM - broadcasts a country music format.
 KLRR 101.7 FM - commercial adult album alternative music radio station in Redmond, Oregon, broadcasting to the Bend, Oregon area.
 KEGB-LP 102.1 FM - Christian Radio 3ABN Radio, broadcasting to the Bend Oregon area.
 KWPK-FM 104.1 FM - Hot Adult Contemporary format.
 KNLX 104.9 FM - Spanish Religious format.
 KQAK 105.7 FM - Classic Hits format.
 KWXS 107.7 FM - CHR-Rhythmic format.

Infrastructure

Transportation

Air
Alaska Airlines, Avelo Airlines, Horizon Air and SkyWest Airlines (flying as Alaska Airlines, American Eagle, Delta Connection and United Express) provide direct service to Burbank, Seattle, Salt Lake City, Phoenix, Denver, Los Angeles, San Diego and San Francisco. The U.S. Forest Service operates an air base and training center for firefighting.

Several significant general aviation companies are based at Bend Airport, including Precise Flight, which develops oxygen systems, speed brakes, landing lights and other modifications for general aviation aircraft, and Epic Aircraft.

Bus

The Bend Hawthorne Transit Center is a hub for the Cascades East Transit center with connections to intercity bus services including Pacific Crest Bus Lines, POINT Intercity Bus Service, the People Mover, and the Central Oregon Breeze.

Bend was previously the only metropolitan area west of the Mississippi River without a public bus system. A measure that would have created a transit district was on the November 2004 ballot, but was defeated 53 to 41 percent. As of August 2006, however, funding was acquired and the B.A.T. (Bend Area Transit) bus service began on a limited basis. Buses have been running since September 27, 2006.

During summer 2007, not a single bus purchased was in operation (though several were due to weak A/C systems) and litigation was underway.

There are currently nine fixed bus routes offered by Cascades East Transit in Bend. The city is also started experimenting with a shared-ride van in 2019. The project was initially designed to find a replacement for a cancelled route that had limited riders.

Roads and highways

Bend lies at the intersection of U.S. Route 20 and U.S. Route 97. The latter runs on an expressway alignment through the city known as the Bend Parkway; a business route for US 97 runs along 3rd Street. The city is also served by the Century Drive Highway No. 372 which provides access to Mount Bachelor.

In an effort to improve the safety of the city's non-driving residents, Bend has been implementing roundabouts within the city.

Rail
A BNSF main line runs north–south through the city; there are numerous spurs off of the main line which serve industrial rail customers. The Spokane, Portland and Seattle Railway ran passenger service six days a week on a mixed train along that line from Bend to Wishram, Washington until some point between 1968 and 1970.

Sustainable practices
In 2016, Bend adopted the Transportation System Plan, which is a 20-year plan that strives to achieve a healthy, equitable future for the entire community. The city is using community input to help this plan move forward, using experiments and data to drive their decisions on how people move within the city while incorporating land use throughout.

In July 2019, Oregon State University Cascade launched a ride share program as part of a study called Ride Bend, which was active until March 2020. Ride Bend hired the transit company Downtowner to help set up and implement an on demand, app based, electric van service in Bend's west side. Part of Ride Bend's study was to see whether people prefer sharing rides to get to their destination over fixed bus routes.

Ride Bend noticed that few people were using public transportation within the city, and many bus systems, such as Cascades East Transit, had to cancel their services because not enough people were taking the bus. Ride Bend not only succeeded in getting people to use public transportation again, effectively helping with traffic calming, but they also brought people to broader areas within the city.

An estimated 40,000 people have moved to Bend since the Transportation System Plan was written, and most of them brought cars with them.

While Ride Bend is directly addressing carbon emissions, plenty of other businesses surrounding Bend are reducing the amount of impact a car has on the environment after its use. Tires can be processed and reused, batteries and oil can be treated so no toxic waste gets put into the surface runoff in the streets and landfill.
While the Transportation System Plan just began in 2016, the city looks towards a 20-year investment in creating a brighter future in transportation use and waste management.

Notable people
Ashton Eaton – decathlete, Olympian
Brian Malarkey – celebrity chef
George P. Putnam – publisher, mayor (1912–1913), husband of Amelia Earhart
Laurenne Ross – skier, Olympian

Sister cities

Bend has multiple sister cities:
  Fujioka Town (Toyota City), Aichi Japan
  Condega, Nicaragua
  Muzaffarabad, Pakistan
  Belluno, Veneto, Italy

See also

 List of people from Bend, Oregon
 Sisters, Oregon

References

External links

 City of Bend, Oregon
 Entry for Bend in the Oregon Blue Book
 
 
Bend's Old Mill District

 
1901 establishments in Oregon
Populated places established in 1901
Cities in Deschutes County, Oregon
Cities in Oregon
County seats in Oregon
Logging communities in the United States